Bargoshad may refer to:
 Bargoshad, Kurdistan
 Bargoshad, West Azerbaijan

See also 
 Bargushad (disambiguation)